Lison Nowaczyk (born 27 January 2003) is a French swimmer. She competed in the women's 4 × 100 metre freestyle relay event at the 2020 European Aquatics Championships, in Budapest, Hungary, winning the bronze medal.

References

External links
 

2003 births
Living people
French female freestyle swimmers
Place of birth missing (living people)
European Aquatics Championships medalists in swimming